Babatorun (known as Babtrun in Arabic) is a town in the Altınözü District of Hatay Province, Turkey. The population of Babatorun was 1,309 as of 2012.

References

Populated places in Hatay Province
Towns in Turkey
Altınözü District